The 2018–19 Houston Baptist Huskies men's basketball team represent Houston Baptist University in the 2018–19 NCAA Division I men's basketball season. They are led by head coach Ron Cottrell in his 28th season at HBU. The Huskies play their home games at Sharp Gymnasium as members of the Southland Conference.

Previous season 
The Huskies finished the 2017–18 season 6–25, 2–16 in Southland play to finish in a tie for 11th place. They failed to qualify for the Southland tournament.

Roster

Schedule and results
Sources:

|-
!colspan=12 style=| Non-conference regular season

|-
!colspan=12 style=|Southland regular season

|-
!colspan=9 style=| Southland tournament

See also
2018–19 Houston Baptist Huskies women's basketball team

References

Houston Christian Huskies men's basketball seasons
Houston Baptist
Houston Baptist Huskies basketball
Houston Baptist Huskies basketball